is a Japanese former Nippon Professional Baseball infielder.

References 

1962 births
Living people
Baseball people from Wakayama Prefecture 
Nippon Professional Baseball infielders
Hiroshima Toyo Carp players
Medalists at the 1984 Summer Olympics
Olympic baseball players of Japan
Olympic gold medalists for Japan
Japanese baseball coaches
Nippon Professional Baseball coaches